Megrelishvili is a Georgian surname. Notable people with the surname include:
Giorgi Megrelishvili (born 1976), Georgian actor, director and scriptwriter
Haim Megrelishvili (born 1982), retired Israeli football defender
Jemal Megrelishvili (born 1950), Soviet wrestler

Surnames of Georgian origin
Georgian-language surnames